Julia Pępiak (21 September 1890 – 17 March 1971) was a Polish woman born in Bełżec. She is one of the Righteous Among the Nations.

Life 
During World War II and the German occupation in Poland, for three years (from 1941) until liberation, she hid in Bełżec Jewish women: Salomea Helman and her daughter Bronia. After the Second World War, those rescued left Poland for Israel.

On December 27, 1999, Julia Pępiak received the title of Righteous Among the Nations awarded by Yad Vashem in Jerusalem. She was buried at the Bródno Cemetery in Warsaw.

Her son Zygmunt Pępiak became a Catholic priest, Franciscan, father Sebastian.

She is the main protagonist in the book "Righteous from Bełżec" by Antoni Madejski.

See also
Cecylia and Maciej Brogowski
German Nazi extermination camp SS-Sonderkommando Belzec in Bełżec
German retribution against Poles who helped Jews
Irena Sendler
Polish Righteous Among the Nations
Rescue of Jews by Poles during the Holocaust

References 

1890 births
1971 deaths
Burials at Bródno Cemetery
Polish humanitarians
Women humanitarians
Polish Righteous Among the Nations
Catholic Righteous Among the Nations